The Ministry of Higher Education and Scientific Research is a department of the Government of Syria that is responsible for maintaining and implementing government policies in higher education in Syria.

History
The history of the ministry goes back to 1966. It was created in the name of the Ministry of Higher Education by Decree 143 issued on November 24, 1966.

As for the ministry in its current form, it was established on December 3, 2019 under Law No. 27,  and it has been headed by Engineer Bassam Ibrahim since November 26, 2018.

Responsibility
The Ministry performs the following tasks:

1- Proposing the general policy for the higher education sector within the higher education institutions, setting plans compatible with this policy, and supervising its implementation.

2- Proposing a general policy for scientific research within the scope of higher education institutions, coordinating with research institutions affiliated with other ministries, and following up on their implementation.

3- Supervising higher education and scientific research institutions affiliated with or affiliated with the Ministry.

4- Proposing draft laws and regulations and issuing the necessary instructions to organize higher education institutions and the Ministry's affiliates.

5- Developing the institutional and administrative work of higher education institutions.

6- Proposing the creation of public and private higher education institutions.

7- Securing opportunities to enroll in higher education in line with the requirements of sustainable development and societal needs.

8- Providing an academic, research and social environment that supports creativity, excellence, innovation, refining talents, and supporting and encouraging cultural, artistic, social and sports activity.

9- Empowering the Arabic language and working on developing its vocabulary to meet the demands of sciences and arts in a way that meets the needs of the times.

10- Encouraging investment in scientific research.

11- Strengthening scientific, technical and technical cooperation in the field of higher education and scientific research with countries, Arab, regional and international organizations and Arab and foreign institutions, and expanding its fields in modern and developed trends.

12- Building national scientific capabilities, especially by dispatching in accordance with the provisions of the Scientific Missions Law.

13- Harmonizing the outputs of higher education, development requirements and the needs of the labor market, and developing quality and accreditation standards in coordination with the concerned authorities.

14- Developing postgraduate programs, specialized research centers and scientific studies centers linked to the ministry.

15- Setting the necessary accreditation criteria and foundations for the recognition of non-Syrian higher education institutions and the equivalency of certificates issued by them.

16- Contribute to the implementation of the state's health policy in coordination with the Ministry of Health and other ministries concerned with the health sector and adherence to the health work rules approved by the Ministry of Health.

17- Follow up on the affairs of Syrian students studying outside the Syrian Arab Republic.

18- Representing the Syrian Arab Republic in regional and international conferences and seminars related to higher education and scientific research.

19- Organizing the affairs of international students in the Syrian Arab Republic in accordance with scientific cooperation agreements and their implementation programmes.

20- Developing admission tests in educational institutions affiliated with or affiliated with the Ministry and measuring and studying the outputs of these institutions with the aim of developing the extent to which they achieve their objectives and meet the requirements of the labor market.

Organisation
Organisation scheme:

Directorates of the Ministry:

 Student Affairs Directorate
 Directorate of Cultural Relations
 Directorate of Equivalency of Certificates
 Administrative Development Directorate
 Directorate of Scientific Missions
 Directorate of Scientific Research
 Directorate of Planning and International Cooperation
 Directorate of Private Educational Institutions
 Quality and Accreditation Directorate
 Directorate of Educational Hospitals
 Directorate of Information and Electronic Publishing
 Directorate of Administrative Affairs
 Directorate of Information Technology and Communications
 Directorate of Educational Authority Affairs
 Engineering Affairs Directorate
 Directorate of Accounting for Scientific Missions
 Contracts Department
 Single Window Directorate
 Legal Affairs Directorate
 Department of Internal Control

Bodies and Centers
 Measurement and calendar center
 Excellence and Creativity Authority
 IT Center
 General Authority for Biotechnology
 Arabic language complex
 General Authority of the Student Credit Fund

Teaching Hospitals
 Al-Mouwasat University Hospital, Damascus
 Al-Assad University Hospital, Damascus
 University Children's Hospital, Damascus
 Al-Biruni University Hospital, Damascus
 University Hospital of Obstetrics and Gynecology, Damascus
 University Hospital of Dermatology and Venereology, Damascus
University Cardiac Surgery Hospital in Damascus
 Oral and Maxillofacial University Hospital, Damascus
 Aleppo University Hospital
 Al-Kindi University Hospital, Aleppo (destroyed)
 University Hospital of Cardiology and Surgery, Aleppo
 University Hospital of Obstetrics and Gynecology in Aleppo
 Al-Assad University Hospital, Lattakia
 Tishreen University Hospital, Lattakia

Universities and Institutes
 Public universities
 University of Damascus
 Aleppo University
 Tishreen University
 Al-Baath University
 Al-Furat University
 Syrian Virtual University
 University of Hama
 University of Tartous
 Private universities
 University of Kalamoon
 Cordoba Private University
 Ittihad Private University
 Arab International University
 International University for Science and Technology
 Syrian Private University
 Wadi International University
 Andalusia University for Medical Sciences
 Al-Jazeera University
 Al-Hawash Private University
 Ebla Private University
 Al-Shahba Private University
 Yarmouk Private University
 Arab University for Science and Technology
 Arab Academy for Science, Technology and Maritime Transport
 Al-Wataniya Private University
 National Private University
 University of the Levant for Sharia Sciences
 Al-Rasheed International Private University for Science and Technology
 Qasyoun Private University
 Bilad Al-Sham University
 Omdurman Islamic University Damascus
 Al-Manara Private University
 Arab Academy for E-Business
 Antioch Syrian Private University
 Higher institutes
 Higher Institutes of the Ministry of Higher Education
Higher Institute of Dramatic Arts
 High Institute of Music HIM
 Higher Institute of Business Administration HIBA
 Institut National d'Administration INA
Higher Institute for Applied Sciences and Technology HIAST
 Higher Institute for Demographic Studies and Researches HIDSR
 Higher Institutes of Universities
  University of Damascus
 Higher Institute for Laser Research and its Applications
 Higher Institute for Research and Seismic Studies
 Higher Institute of Administrative Development
 Higher Institute of Translation and Interpretation
 Higher Institute of Languages
 Aleppo University
 Institute of Arab Scientific Heritage
 Higher Institute of Languages
 Tishreen University
 Higher Institute of Marine Research
 Higher Institute for Environmental Research
 Higher Institute of Languages
 Al-Baath University
 Higher Institute of Language Teaching
 Higher Institute of Water Management HIWM
 Hama University
 Higher Institute of Languages
 Technical institutes

Boards
 Council of Higher Education
 Supreme Council for Technical Education

List of Ministers

See also
List of universities in Syria
Education in Syria

References 

Education ministries
Government ministries of Syria
1966 establishments in Syria